

Image gallery

References

Medical equipment